The Iowa Xplosion was a team of the Women's Football Alliance which began play for the 2011 season.  Based in Des Moines, Iowa, home games were played in nearby Martensdale at Martensdale St Mary's Football Stadium.

The Xplosion folded after the 2011 season.

Season-By-Season

|-
|2011 || 5 || 3 || 0 || 2nd American Midwest || --
|-
!Totals || 5 || 3 || 0
|colspan="2"|

2011

Standings

Season schedule

External links 
 

American football teams in Iowa
Women's Football Alliance teams
Sports in Des Moines, Iowa
American football teams established in 2011
American football teams disestablished in 2011
2011 establishments in Iowa
2011 disestablishments in Iowa
Warren County, Iowa
Women in Iowa